Ugíjar is a municipality located in the province of Granada, Spain. According to the 2005 census (INE), the city has a population of 2524 inhabitants. Historically, it was a Moorish village.

Populated places 
 Cherín
 Jorairatar
 Las Canteras
 Los Montoros

References

External links
 

Municipalities in the Province of Granada